George Cârjan (born 7 November 1988) is a Romanian footballer who plays as a forward for Oțelul Galați. Cârjan made his Liga I debut on 21 July 2013 for Botoșani, in a 0-0 draw against CFR Cluj. In his career he played also for clubs such as: Dunărea Galați, Botoșani, Ceahlăul Piatra Neamț or Baia Mare.

Honours
Oțelul Galați
Liga III: 2020–21, 2021–22

References

External links
 
 

Living people
1988 births
Sportspeople from Galați
Romanian footballers
Association football forwards
Liga I players
Liga II players
ASC Oțelul Galați players
FCM Dunărea Galați players
FC Botoșani players
CSM Ceahlăul Piatra Neamț players
CS Minaur Baia Mare (football) players